Christy Williams  (born 14 August 1980), is an international women's motorcycle trials rider. Williams is a four time Canadian Women's Trials Champion and ten time American NATC Women's Trials Champion.

Biography
Williams was born in New Westminster, British Columbia, Canada. In 1999 Williams headed over the border into the United States to compete in the NATC Women's Trials Championship . She won the 1999 series ahead of American rider Pam DeBruin then returned to defend her title in 2000 and 2001, both years winning ahead of her sister Kerry Williams.

They repeated their one-two combination again in 2003 and 2004, then Christy won in 2005 ahead of Louise Forsley.  Williams returned to take three more titles in 2008 until 2010.

In August 2017 Williams announced her retirement from national competition after 20 years, though she still plans on competing back home in Canada.

National Trials Championship Career

=International Trials Championship Career

Honors
 Canadian Women's Trials Champion 2000, 2001, 2002, 2004
 US NATC Women's Trials Champion 1999, 2000, 2001, 2003, 2004, 2005, 2007, 2008, 2009, 2010

Related Reading
NATC Trials Championship
FIM Trial European Championship

References 

1980 births
Living people
Sportspeople from New Westminster
Canadian sportswomen
Canadian motorcycle racers
Motorcycle trials riders
Female motorcycle racers